Otago University AFC is a semi-professional association football club in Dunedin, New Zealand. The Men's First team competes in the Southern League after coming 3rd in the 2021 ODT FootballSouth Premier League. The Women's First and Second Teams both compete in the Women's Southern Premiership.

The club is affiliated with the University of Otago in Dunedin, New Zealand; it is one of the oldest clubs associated with the University of Otago, established in 1939. They are based at Logan Park in an area immediately beside the university campus, and play their home fixtures at the nearby Caledonian Ground. The men's first team also participates in the Chatham Cup, New Zealand's premier knockout tournament. As a member of Football South, the club was also affiliated with Southern United of the ASB Premiership.

The club strip is traditionally the Otago region colours of blue and varsity gold, the away strip is traditionally baby blue.

The clubs best run in the Chatham Cup was in 2014 where they made it to the final 16 before losing 0–1 to Dunedin Technical. However in the 2021 edition, the club made the quarter-finals for the first time, facing North Shore United away.

References

External links
 OUAFC website
 Facebook page

University of Otago
Association football clubs in Dunedin
Association football clubs established in 1939
1939 establishments in New Zealand